Alex Jack Nicholson (born 1 February 1994) is a Welsh footballer who plays as a right-back and as a right-winger for Blyth Spartans. He has also played for the Wales U19 national team. He previously played for Newcastle Academy and Reserves, Chorley, Preston North End, Blyth Spartans, South Shields and Gateshead.

Career

Newcastle United
Nicholson signed for Newcastle United in 2007, originally playing as a winger before converting to full-back. He made his reserve team debut in December 2010 but did not play for the first team.

Preston North End
After leaving Newcastle, Nicholson signed for Preston North End on 26 September 2013 until the end of the season, having trained with the team without a contract since pre-season.
He made his first team debut in the Football League Trophy on 8 October 2013, this turned out to be his only appearance for the club.

On 27 March 2014, Nicholson joined Chorley on loan. Helping them to secure the Evo-Stik Northern Premier League Premier Division, securing promotion to the Conference North. He was then released by Preston North End at the end of the 2013–14 season.

Blyth Spartans
Nicholson joined Blyth Spartans, playing in the Northern Premier League Premier Division, signing a one-year contract at the start of the 2014–2015 season. He was part of the squad which reached the 2014/2015 FA Cup 1st Round Proper being drawn against Conference club Altrincham on 27 October, he was then part of the team that reached the 2nd round in the FA Cup after beating Altrincham 4–1. He was part of the team that famously reached the 3rd round of the FA Cup before bowing out of the cup, losing 3–2 to Birmingham City. Nicholson later signed another year contract at the start of the 2015–2016 season.

Gateshead
In June 2019, Nicholson became Mike Williamson's first signing when he moved to National League North side Gateshead. At the end of his first season with the club, he won the club's Players' Player of the Year Award. In the 2021–22 season, Nicholson made 23 league appearances as the club won promotion to the National League. On 6 June 2022, it was announced that Nicholson was to leave to the club to move away from full-time football.

Blyth Spartans return
In June 2022, Nicholson returned to National League North club Blyth Spartans.

International career
Nicholson was selected for a Wales U19 friendly match against Germany in September 2012, and went on to play in all three of Wales' games at the 2013 U19 European Championship qualifiers in Slovenia.

Career statistics

External links

References

1994 births
Living people
Footballers from Newcastle upon Tyne
Welsh footballers
Association football defenders
Preston North End F.C. players
Chorley F.C. players
Blyth Spartans A.F.C. players
South Shields F.C. (1974) players
Gateshead F.C. players
Northern Premier League players
National League (English football) players
Wales youth international footballers